Don Giovanni is a 1970 Italian comedy-drama film directed by Carmelo Bene. The narrative follows how Don Giovanni tries to seduce a young woman who is manically searching for Christian icons. The film is loosely based on Jules Barbey d'Aurevilly's short story "The Greatest Love of Don Juan", from the collection Les Diaboliques.

The film premiered in the Directors' Fortnight section of the 1970 Cannes Film Festival.

Cast
 Carmelo Bene as Don Giovanni
 Lydia Mancinelli as Mother
 Vittorio Bodini as Father
 Gea Marotta as Girl
John Francis Lane as Narrator
 Salvatore Vendittelli as Commander

References

1970 films
1970 comedy-drama films
Films based on short fiction
Films based on works by Jules Barbey d'Aurevilly
Films directed by Carmelo Bene
Italian comedy-drama films
1970s Italian-language films
Films based on the Don Juan legend
1970s Italian films